Rosen is a surname of Ashkenazi Jewish origin, the name deriving from the German word for roses. Notable people with this surname include:

People

A–H

 Adam Rosen (born 1984), American-born British luger Olympian
 Al Rosen (1924–2015), American All Star and MVP baseball player
 Al Rosen (actor) (1910–1990), American actor in Cheers
 Albert Rosen (1924–1997), conductor
 Andrea Rosen (born 1974), American comedian and actress
 Andy Rosen (also known as Goat), American musician
 Anton Rosen (1859–1928), Danish architect
 Barry Rosen, American diplomat held during the Iran hostage crisis
 Beatrice Rosen (born 1984), French-American actress
 Carl Gustaf von Rosen (1909–1977), Swedish pioneer aviator
 Charles Rosen (1927–2012), American pianist and author
 Charles Rosen (scientist) (1917–2002), Canadian artificial intelligence researcher
 Charley Rosen (born 1941), American basketball coach and sports writer
Conrad von Rosen (1628–1715), Marshal of the French Army
 Daniel Rosen, comedian and announcer
 David Rosen (disambiguation), several people, including:
 David Rosen (artist) (born 1959), South African artist and fashion designer
 David Rosen (business) (born 1934), chief executive officer of SEGA
 David Rosen (entomologist) (1936-1997), Israeli entomologist
 David Rosen (musicologist) (born 1938), professor of musicology at Cornell University
 David Rosen (politics), fundraiser for Hillary Clinton in 2000
 David Rosen (rabbi) (born 1951), former Chief Rabbi of Ireland
 David M. Rosen, American anthropologist
 Eliyahu Chaim Rosen (1899–1984), Polish-born rabbi in the Ukraine
 Eric Rosen (disambiguation), several people, including:
 Eric S. Rosen (born 1953), Kansas Supreme Court Justice
 Eric Rosen (playwright) (born 1970), American theater director and playwright
 Eric Rosen (chess player) (born 1993), American chess player and streamer
 Eunice Rosen (born 1930), American bridge player
 Fred Rosen (disambiguation), several people, including:
 Fred Rosen (author), true crime author and former columnist for The New York Times
 Fred Rosen (businessman), former CEO of Ticketmaster, co-founder of the Bel Air Homeowners Alliance
 Fred Rosen (physician) (1930–2005), American medical researcher
 Freda Rosen (1945–2007), American playwright, director, political activist, social therapist and mentor
 Friedrich Rosen (1856–1935), German Orientalist, diplomat and politician
 Gerald Ellis Rosen (born 1951), American judge
 Gerald Harris Rosen (born 1933), American theoretical physicist
 Goody Rosen (1912–1994), Canadian All Star major league baseball player
 Gustaf-Fredrik von Rosen (1895–1956), Swedish officer and murderer
 Harold Rosen (electrical engineer) (born 1926), American electrical engineer
 Harry Rosen (born 1931), Canadian businessman
 Harvey Rosen, Canadian mayor
 Herb Rosen, founder of Skippers Seafood & Chowder House
 Hilary Rosen (born 1958), former chief executive of the RIAA

J–Z
 Jack Rosen (born 1949), chairman of the American Jewish Congress
 Jacky Rosen (born 1957), American politician
 James Rosen (disambiguation), several people, including:
 James Rosen (jurist) (1909–1972), United States federal judge
 James Rosen (journalist), American journalist
 Jay Rosen (born 1956), American journalism professor
 Jay Rosen (drummer) (born 1961), American musician
 Jeffrey Rosen (disambiguation), several people
 Jelka Rosen (1868–1935), Serbian painter
 Jeremy Rosen (born 1942), British-born Orthodox rabbi
 John Rosen, Canadian criminal defence lawyer
 Joseph Rosen (1858–1936), rabbi, the Rogatchover Gaon
 Joseph A. Rosen (1877–1949),  American agronomist
 Josh Rosen (born 1997), American football player
 Kelly Rosen (born 1995), Estonian footballer
 Larry Rosen (executive), Canadian retail chief executive officer
 Lawrence Rosen (anthropologist) anthropologist
 Lawrence Rosen (attorney), American attorney and computer specialist
 Leo Rosen, American cryptoanalyst
 Louis Rosen (1918–2009), nuclear physicist
 Magnus Rosén (born 1963), Swedish musician
 Marion Rosen (1914-2012), German-American physiotherapist
 Mel Rosen (born 1928), American track coach
 Martin Rosen (director), British film director
 Michael Rosen (born 1946), English poet, broadcaster and educationalist 
 Michel de Rosen (born 1951), U.S. businessman
 Milton Rosen (1915–2014), Engineer and project manager in the US space program
 Moishe Rosen (1932–2010), founder of Jews for Jesus
 Moses Rosen (1912–1994), Chief Rabbi of Romania
 Nancy Rosen, U.S. sculptor
 Nathan Rosen (1909–1995), Israeli physicist
 Nir Rosen (born 1977), American journalist and chronicler of the Iraq War
 Paul Rosen (born 1960), Canadian sledge hockey goalie and motivational speaker
 Phil Rosen (1888–1951), American film director and cinematographer
 Pinchas Rosen (1887–1978), Israeli founder, statesman and lawyer
 Rachel Rosen (born 1993), American physicist
 Rich Rosen (born 1956), software developer
 Robert Rosén (born 1987), Swedish ice hockey player
Robert Rosen (disambiguation), several people, including:
Robert Rosen (photographer), Australian photographer
 Robert Rosen (theoretical biologist) (1934–1998), American theoretical biologist
 Robert Rosen (writer) (born 1952), American writer
 Roman Rosen (1849–1921), Russian diplomat
 Sam Rosen (comics) (died 1992), comic book author
 Sam Rosen (sportscaster) (born 1948), U.S. sportscaster
 Selina Rosen (born 1960), U.S. science fiction publisher, editor, and author
 Shabtai Rosenne (1917–2010), UK-born Israeli professor and diplomat
 Shlomo Rosen (1905–1985), Israeli politician and minister
 Sherwin Rosen (1938–2001), American labor economist
  (born 1978), Prime Rabbi of Romania
 Stan Rosen (1906–1984), American NFL football player
 Stanley Rosen (1929-2014), American philosopher
 Stephen Rosen (disambiguation) or Steven Rosen, several people
 William Rosen (born 1928), American bridge player
 Zack Rosen (born 1989), All-American basketball player at University of Pennsylvania; plays for Maccabi Ashdod in Israel

Fictional characters
 Dr. Arnold Rosen, a cardiologist on Mad Men, who lives one floor below the Drapers
 Sylvia Rosen, Arnold Rosen's wife on Mad Men
 David Rosen, the Attorney General of the United States on Scandal

Places
Rosen, Burgas Province, Bulgaria
Rosen, Dobrich Province, Bulgaria
Rosen, Minnesota, unincorporated community, United States

See also
Roesen, a surname
Rosén, a surname
Rosen College of Hospitality Management (College of the University of Central Florida), academic college
John and Zeta Rosen Way, Edmonton, Canada
Rozov, a surname

References

German-language surnames
Jewish surnames
Yiddish-language surnames